Payshanba is an urban-type settlement in Samarqand Region, Uzbekistan. It is the capital of Kattakurgan District.

References

Populated places in Samarqand Region
Urban-type settlements in Uzbekistan